Sinha is a surname commonly used in India and Bangladesh. Sinha surname is from the Eastern part of India. Sinha (meaning "lion") belong to the Kayastha community and largely populated in West Bengal, Jharkhand, Bihar, and Uttar Pradesh. You may refer to:

 Akhoury Purnendu Bhusan Sinha (b. 1928), Indian solid state chemist 
 Amara Sinha (c. AD 375) Sanskrit grammarian and poet 
 Anindya Sinha - Indian primatologist 
 Anubhav Sinha (b. 1965) Indian film director 
 Anugrah Narayan Sinha (1887–1957) Indian politician 
 Anupam Sinha - Raj Comics artist 
 Basawon Singh (Sinha) (1909–1989) Indian nationalist and freedom fighter
 Bejoy Kumar Sinha (1909-1992), Indian revolutionary
  Bikash Sinha (b.1945) Indian physicist, Padma Bhusan awardee
 Bidya Sinha Saha Mim, Bangladeshi film actress 
 Gayatri Sinha - Indian art critic and curator based in New Delhi
 Gunjan Sinha (b. 1967), Indian-American entrepreneur and business executive
 Indra Sinha (b. 1950) Indian/British author 
 Jagmohanlal Sinha (b. 1920) Indian lawyer, former judge 
 J. K. Sinha - Indian Police Service officer 
 Kaliprasanna Sinha (1841(?)–1870), also known as Hootum Pyancha, Bengali author, playwright, and philanthropist
 Krityunjai Prasad Sinha - Indian theoretical physicist 
 Kumares C. Sinha - Indian-American engineer, researcher and educator
 Mala Sinha (b. 1936) Indian actress 
 Man Mohan Sinha (b. 1933) Air Marshal I.A.F
 Maniklal Sinha (1916-1994), Indian writer, novelist, historian, Archaeologist
 Manjul Sinha - Indian television director 
 Manoj Sinha (b. 1959) Indian politician, Ghazipur 
 Nirmal Chandra Sinha (1911–1997), Indian tibetologist and author
 Paul Sinha (b. 1970) British Bengali stand-up comedian and general practitioner
 Rameshwar Prasad Sinha (d. 1965) Indian politician
 Ranjit Sinha (1953–2021), Indian police officer and former Director of the Central Bureau of Investigation (CBI)
 Rashmi Sinha (b. 1960) Homemaker 
 Ravindra Kumar Sinha (b. 1954) Biologist and environmentalist 
 Raja Radhika Raman Sinha (1937–2008), Indian civil engineer and a writer of Hindi literature
 Ratan Kumar Sinha (b. 1951), Indian nuclear scientist and mechanical engineer
 Sachidanand Sinha (b. 1937) Indian poet 
 Sandali Sinha (b. 1971) Indian actress 
 Sarat Chandra Sinha (1914–2005) Indian writer and politician 
 Satyendra Narayan Sinha (1917–2006) Indian politician 
 Satyendra Prasanna Sinha, 1st Baron Sinha (1863–1928) Indian lawyer and statesman 
 Shantha Sinha - Indian professor and activist 
 Sonakshi Sinha - Indian actress and model
 Shatrughan Sinha (b. 1946) Indian actor and politician 
 Shumona Sinha (b. 1973), naturalised French writer born in Calcutta
 Siddharth Sinha - Indian filmmaker
 Smrity Sinha (b. 1989), Indian film actress
 Sri Krishna Sinha (1887–1962) Indian nationalist known as Bihar Kesari, first Chief Minister of Bihar
 Srinivas Kumar Sinha (b. 1926) Indian politician 
 Surajit Chandra Sinha (1926–2002), Indian anthropologist
 Surendra Kumar Sinha (b. 1951), Bangladeshi lawyer and jurist 
 Tapan Sinha (1924-2009). Indian and Bengali film director, Dadasaheb Phalke and Padma Shri awardee. 
 Tarak Sinha (1950–2021), Indian cricket coach
 Toshi Sinha - Indian voice actress
 U K Sinha (b. 1952), Indian businessman and politician 
 Vidya Sinha (b. 1947), Indian film and television actress 
 Yashwant Sinha (b. 1937), Indian politician
 Yashvardhan Kumar Sinha (b. 1958), Indian diplomat

Fictional characters
 Baldev Sinha, Shanti Sinha, and Virender Sinha in Soldier (1998 Indian film) 
 Akash Sinha and Siddharth Sinha in Armaan (2003 film)
 Shekher Sinha, Sandhaya Sinha, and Jai Sinha in Dil Jo Bhi Kahey... (2005 film) 
 Vikram Sinha in Krrish (2006 film) 
 Professor Sinha's five daughters in Kahiin To Hoga (soap opera)
 Siddharth Sinha in Dil Chahta Hai (2001 film)

See also
 Antônio Naelson
 Sinha 
 Singh
 Sinhagad 
 Sinhalese language 
 Sinhalese people 
 Baron Sinha - British peerage created in 1919 
 Mohan Sinha Mehta 
 Sri Lanka Sinha Regiment 
 Sri Vikrama Rajasinha

Surnames